John Sweet Donald (January 12, 1869 – January 10, 1934) was a politician and dentist from the U.S. state of Wisconsin.

Biography
Born on a farm near Mount Vernon, Wisconsin in the town of Springdale, Dane County, Wisconsin, Donald graduated from Northwestern Business College in 1887, in Madison, Wisconsin. He then graduated with a bachelor of science degree from Valparaiso University in 1894. In 1897, Donald received a degree in dentistry from the Chicago College. He was Wisconsin's nineteenth Secretary of State, serving two terms from January 6, 1913 to January 1, 1917. He was a Republican and served under governors Francis E. McGovern and Emanuel L. Philipp. He resided in Mt. Horeb, Wisconsin at the time of his election. He served as the Springdale town assessor in 1892. He served as chairman of the Springdale Town Board from 1899 to 1902. Donald served in the Wisconsin State Assembly from 1903 to 1907. He served in the Wisconsin State Senate from 1907 to 1913. He also owned farms in the town of Springdale and taught agriculture at the University of Wisconsin since 1920. Donald died at his home in Madison from a two-year illness.

One of his farms, now known as the John Sweet Donald Farmstead, is listed on the National Register of Historic Places.

Notes

References

External links

Secretaries of State of Wisconsin
Republican Party Wisconsin state senators
Republican Party members of the Wisconsin State Assembly
Mayors of places in Wisconsin
Wisconsin city council members
1869 births
1934 deaths
People from Mount Vernon, Wisconsin
Madison Business College alumni
Valparaiso University alumni
University of Wisconsin–Madison faculty
American dentists
Farmers from Wisconsin
Burials in Wisconsin